Microseris paludosa is a species of flowering plant in the family Asteraceae known by the common names marsh silverpuffs and marsh microseris. It is endemic to California, where it has a scattered distribution between southern Mendocino and northern San Luis Obispo Counties, mainly near the coast. Its habitat includes coastal scrub and grassland and coniferous forest.

Description
This is a perennial herb growing up to 70 centimeters tall with a branching stem. The leaves are up to 35 centimeters in length and smooth, toothed or lobed along the edges. The somewhat hairy inflorescence is borne on an erect or curving peduncle. The flower head contains up to 70 yellow ray florets.

The fruit is an achene with a whitish body a few millimeters long. At the tip of the body is a large pappus made up of 5 to 10 long, bristly scales.

References

External links
Jepson Manual Treatment — Microseris paludosa
USDA Plants Profile: Microseris paludosa
Flora of North America
California Native Plant Society Rare Plant Profile
Microseris paludosa — U.C. Photo gallery

paludosa
Endemic flora of California
Natural history of the California chaparral and woodlands
Natural history of the California Coast Ranges
Taxa named by John Thomas Howell